Nisista is a genus of moths in the family Geometridae erected by Francis Walker in 1860.

Species
Nisista galearia (Guenée, 1857)
Nisista notodontaria Walker, 1860
Nisista serrata (Walker, 1857)

References

Ennominae